Béatrice Martin (born September 22, 1989), better known by her stage name Cœur de pirate (French for Pirate's Heart), is a Canadian singer-songwriter and pianist. A francophone from Montreal, she sings mostly in French and has been credited in Montreal Mirror with "bringing la chanson française to a whole new generation of Quebec youth".

Career

Early beginnings
Born in the province of Quebec, Martin started playing the piano when she was only three years old. She entered the Conservatoire de musique du Québec à Montréal at age nine and studied there for five years.

At age 15, she played as a keyboardist in the post-hardcore band December Strikes First, which starred her best friend, Francis, who would later become the subject of the song "Francis" on her debut album. Martin had a brief stint as keyboardist for Bonjour Brumaire from late 2007 to April 2008.

2007–2009: Debut album and first success 
In a report broadcast on French television, Martin explained that she chose the name "Cœur de pirate" to appear not "as an isolated musician, but to get a band identity from the start". She initially called herself Her Pirate Heart, but translated the name to French when she stopped writing songs in English. She released her debut album Cœur de pirate on September 16, 2008, on Grosse Boîte. Described as "rather simple" musically, it mostly featured her voice and piano playing along with some minor additional instrumentation.

In February 2009, Martin attracted wider media attention when a photographer from Quebec City, Francis Vachon, used the song "Ensemble" as the soundtrack to a viral video on YouTube entitled "Time lapse of a baby playing with his toys", leading to coverage on Good Morning America, Perez Hilton's website, The Globe and Mail, and elsewhere.

2009–2011: Side projects Pearls and Armistice 
In March 2009, Martin released a song in English, "One for Me", under the name Pearls on MySpace. In a later interview she described the project as a joke and said she did not plan to continue it, though she did not rule out the possibility of releasing music in English at a later date.

In June 2009, she made a special appearance on CBC Radio's Q radio show. She performed her single "Ensemble" and a new song, "Place de la République".

Martin performed with Jay Malinowski of Bedouin Soundclash in May 2010 on Q and talked about collaborating with him in the future. She was later featured in a Bedouin Soundclash song, "Brutal Hearts", on the album Light the Horizon. Martin, Malinowski, and several members of the American rock band The Bronx subsequently collaborated on a five-song EP under the band name Armistice, which was released on February 15, 2011.

Martin contributed a new song, "La Reine", to the 2010 edition of CBC Radio 2's Great Canadian Song Quest.

2011 to present 
On March 27, 2011, Martin revealed via her Facebook page that she was to return to the studio to commence work on her second album the following day. Her second album, Blonde, was released on November 7, 2011, in both digital and hard copy versions. "Adieu" and "Golden Baby" were released as singles from this LP.

After announcing her pregnancy in February 2012, Martin stopped touring during the second half of the year and gave birth to a daughter in September. In early 2013, Martin returned from her hiatus with a music video for "Place de la République", the first for which she acted as director, and an international tour beginning in March.

In 2013 she recorded music for the fifth season of the Canadian drama series Trauma, with a soundtrack album released on January 14, 2014.

In 2014 she composed the soundtrack for the Ubisoft Montreal's video game production Child of Light. The soundtrack includes a song, "Off to Sleep", sung in English.

In April 2015, she released the single "Carry On" in both English and French. Both versions of the song appeared on her album, titled Roses. The music video for it was filmed in the Ruins of St Raphael's Church, South Glengarry, Ontario.

On August 12, 2015, it was announced by PR Newswire that Martin has signed a record contract with American record imprints Cherrytree and Interscope Records. Upon signing, she made a statement on Facebook: "It feels wonderful to have Cherrytree Records/Interscope Records join the team," "When I first started listening to music seriously, my musical heroes were all on Cherrytree. I'm sure I'll feel right at home. Huge thanks to Martin Kierszenbaum for believing in me. I can't wait to discover what's in store as I embark on this new adventure."

On June 1, 2018, she released the album En cas de tempête, ce jardin sera fermé, her fourth album which also marks the tenth anniversary of her career.

On April 30, 2021, she released Perséides, her fifth album.

Collaborations
Martin has appeared in concert with French singer Julien Doré, performing a duet of the Rihanna hit "Umbrella". In 2009 she recorded a new version of her song "Pour un infidèle", with Doré featured as the male vocalist. They appeared together in the video for the song, styled as a 1960s-era celebrity couple.

Martin contributed vocals on "Brutal Hearts", the fourth track on the 2010 Bedouin Soundclash album Light the Horizon. Frontman Jay Malinowski and Martin subsequently collaborated under the band name Armistice, releasing a five-track self-titled album on February 11, 2011. In 2010 Martin also contributed vocals to the second track of David Usher's Mile End Sessions album, titled "Everyday Things".

She also appeared in Peter Peter's eponymous debut album Peter Peter in the song "Tergiversate".

Martin co-wrote the song "Jet Lag" with Simple Plan and a demo was recorded with her voice. The final version was recorded with Marie-Mai. The final version is shorter.

She appears on the track "Voila les anges", a cover of the song recorded originally in 1988 by Gamine on the 2012 album Couleurs sur Paris by Nouvelle Vague.

Martin contributed vocals for "Peace Sign" by Canadian synth-pop artist Lights, on the acoustic version of her 2011 album Siberia, released on April 30, 2013.

Martin also contributed vocals on "Suicide Bomber" and "All This (And More)" on the album "Shape Shift with Me" by punk band "Against Me!"

Personal life
On February 29, 2012, Martin announced on Twitter and Facebook that she was expecting a girl with her fiancé, Alex Peyrat, a tattoo artist. Martin and Peyrat were married later that year on July 26 and their daughter was born on September 4.
 
On June 16, 2016, in an op-ed for Vice magazine's Noisey, Martin came out as queer as a response to the shooting at Pulse, a gay club in Orlando. The following day, she announced that she was filing for divorce from her husband. At the time, she was known to be in a relationship with Laura Jane Grace, who fronts Against Me!, although they later broke up. Martin and Peyrat remarried in March 2017, but were divorced again in 2018.

On August 17, 2021, Martin announced her second pregnancy with partner Marc Flynn. Their son was born January 16, 2022.

Discography

 Cœur de pirate (2008)
 Blonde (2011)
 Trauma (2014)
 Child of Light (2014, soundtrack for video game Child of Light)
 Roses (2015)
 En cas de tempête, ce jardin sera fermé (2018)
 Perséides (2021)
 Impossible à aimer (2021)

Awards
Cœur de pirate received a 2009 CBC Radio 3 "Bucky" award determined by listener votes. Her song "Comme des enfants" received the 2009 "Bucky" award for "Best Reason to Learn French". In 2010, Martin won the International Achievement Award at the Francophone SOCAN Awards in Montreal. Martin won the 2014 Original Light Mix Score, New IP award by National Academy of Video Game Trade Reviewers for her work on the video game Child of Light.

Félix Awards 
The Félix Awards are presented by the Association du disque, de l'industrie du spectacle québécois to artists from Quebec. Martin has won four awards from 13 nominations.

|-
| rowspan="3" | 2009
| rowspan="2" | Cœur de pirate
| Debut Artist of the Year
| 
|-
| Female Singer of the Year
| 
|-
| Cœur de pirate
| Pop Album of the Year
| 
|-
| rowspan="4" | 2010
| rowspan="3" | Cœur de pirate
| Female Singer of the Year
| 
|-
| Concert of the Year
| 
|-
| Quebec Artist Most Celebrated Outside of Quebec
| 
|-
| "Pour un infidèle"
| Music Video of the Year
| 
|-
| rowspan="2" | 2011
| rowspan="2" | Cœur de pirate
| Quebec Artist Most Celebrated Outside of Quebec
| 
|-
| Female Singer of the Year
| 
|-
| rowspan="7" | 2012
| rowspan="2" | Cœur de pirate
| Female Singer of the Year
| 
|-
| Quebec Artist Most Celebrated Outside of Quebec
| 
|-
| rowspan="2" | Blonde
| Pop Album of the Year
| 
|-
| Best-Selling Album of the Year
| 
|-
| "Adieu"
| Pop Song of the Year
| 
|-
| "Golden Baby"
| Music Video of the Year
| 
|-
| Cœur de pirate (with Howard Bilerman)
| Album Producer of the Year
| 
|}

Juno Awards

|-
| 2009
| Cœur de pirate
| rowspan=2| Francophone Album of the Year
| 
|-
| 2012
| Blonde
| 
|-
| 2016
| Cœur de pirate
| Fan Choice
| 
|-
| 2019
| En cas de tempête, ce jardin sera fermé
| rowspan=2| Francophone Album of the Year
| 
|-
| rowspan=2| 2022
| Impossible à aimer
| 
|-
| Perséides
| Instrumental Album of the Year
| 
|}

Victoires de la Musique 
The Victoires de la Musique is an annual French award ceremony. Martin has won one award from four nominations.

|-
| rowspan="2" | 2010
| Cœur de pirate
| Group or Artist Newcomer of the Year (Public Vote)
| 
|-
| "Comme des enfants"
| Original Song of the Year
| 
|-
| 2011
| Cœur de pirate
| Female Artist of the Year
| 
|-
| 2012
| Blonde
| Album of the Year
| 
|}

Canadian Independent Music Awards 
Martin has been nominated for five Canadian Independent Music Awards, of which she has won one.

|-
| 2009
| Cœur de pirate
| Favourite Francophone Artist/Group
| 
|-
| 2010
| Cœur de pirate
| Favourite Solo Artist
| 
|-
| rowspan="3" | 2012
| rowspan="2" | Cœur de pirate
| Francophone Artist/Group or Duo of the Year
| 
|-
| Solo Artist of the Year
| 
|-
| "Adieu"
| Video of the Year
| 
|}

References

External links

  
 Coeur de Pirate Interview on YouTube

1989 births
Living people
Canadian women pop singers
Canadian indie pop musicians
Canadian pop pianists
Canadian singer-songwriters
French-language singers of Canada
French Quebecers
Canadian LGBT singers
Canadian LGBT songwriters
Melodica players
Queer singers
Queer songwriters
Queer women
Singers from Montreal
21st-century Canadian pianists
21st-century Canadian women singers
Félix Award winners
21st-century Canadian LGBT people
Juno Award for Francophone Album of the Year winners
21st-century women pianists